Ajai Shukla is an Indian journalist and a retired colonel of Indian Army.
He writes articles on defense policy, production and acquisition and currently works as consulting editor with Business Standard. He earlier worked with DD News and NDTV.

References

External links
 Ajai Shukla's participation at Stratpost panels
 
 
 

Living people
Indian male television journalists
Indian Army officers
1959 births